These are lists of television specials;

By country
 List of television specials on Australian television in 2008

By holiday
 List of Halloween television specials
 List of Christmas television specials
 List of Thanksgiving television specials
 List of Easter television specials
 List of St. Patrick's Day television specials
 List of Valentine's Day television specials

By franchise
 List of 1980s Strawberry Shortcake television specials
 List of One Piece television specials
 List of Lupin III television specials
 List of Looney Tunes television specials
 List of Extreme Makeover: Home Edition specials
 List of Dr. Seuss television specials

By network
 List of GMA Network specials aired

Other
 List of war films and TV specials

See also
 Lists of television programs